Between 1920 and 1939, a total of 63 countries became member states of the League of Nations. 
The Covenant forming the League of Nations was included in the Treaty of Versailles and came into force on 10 January 1920, with the League of Nations being dissolved on 18 April 1946; its assets and responsibilities were transferred to the United Nations.

The League's greatest extent was from 28 September 1934 (when Ecuador joined) to 23 February 1935 (when Paraguay withdrew) with 58 members. At this time, only Costa Rica (22 January 1925), Brazil (14 June 1926), Japan (27 March 1933) and Germany (19 October 1933) had withdrawn, and only Egypt was later joined (on 26 May 1937).

The members (listed from their earliest joining and alphabetically if they joined on the same day) at that time were Argentina, Australia, Belgium, Bolivia, the British Empire, Canada, Chile, China, Colombia, Cuba, Czechoslovakia, Denmark, El Salvador, France, Greece, Guatemala, Haiti, Honduras, India, Italy, Liberia, the Netherlands, New Zealand, Nicaragua, Norway, Panama, Paraguay, Persia/Iran, Peru, Poland, Portugal, Romania, Siam, South Africa, Spain, Sweden, Switzerland, Uruguay, Venezuela, Yugoslavia, Austria, Bulgaria, Finland, Luxembourg, Albania, Estonia, Latvia, Lithuania, Hungary, the Irish Free State, Ethiopia, the Dominican Republic, Mexico, Turkey, Iraq, the Soviet Union, Afghanistan, and Ecuador.

Of the 42 founding members, 23 (or 24, counting the Free France) were members when the League of Nations was dissolved in 1946. A further 21 countries joined between 1920 and 1937, but seven had withdrawn, left, or been expelled before 1946.

Countries are listed under the year in which they joined. The word "withdrew" indicates that a country left of its own choice. The word "left" indicates a country that ceased to exist after annexation by Germany, Italy, or the Soviet Union. The Soviet Union was expelled from the League in 1939, after its invasion of Finland, and was the only country to face that measure.

Despite formulating the concept and signing the Covenant, the United States never joined the League of Nations, and some relatively-isolated sovereign states in Asia also did not join, including Saudi Arabia, Yemen, Mongolia, Nepal, and Bhutan.

Likewise, none of the European microstates of Andorra, Liechtenstein, Monaco, San Marino, and Vatican City ever sought membership in the organization.

At the IX Congress of European Nationalities, an organization of the League of Nations, held in Bern, Galicia, Basque Country and Catalonia, the first three autonomies of Spain, were recognized as a nation. In any case, they were not independent but were represented by the Spanish government.

Map

10 January 1920: founding members
Argentina (withdrew 1921 on rejection of an Argentine resolution that all sovereign states would be admitted to the League. It resumed full membership 26 September 1933)
Belgium
Bolivia
Brazil (withdrew 14 June 1926)
British Empire separate membership for:
United Kingdom
Australia
Canada
India
New Zealand
South Africa
Chile (withdrew 14 May 1938)
China
Colombia
Cuba
Czechoslovakia (occupied by Nazi Germany 15 March 1939)
Denmark
El Salvador (withdrew 11 August 1937)
France (Vichy France withdrew 18 April 1941; withdrawal not recognised by Free French forces)
Greece
Guatemala (withdrew 26 May 1936)
Haiti (withdrew April 1942)
Honduras (withdrew 10 July 1936)
Italy (withdrew 11 December 1937)
Japan (withdrew 27 March 1933)
Liberia
Netherlands
Nicaragua (withdrew 27 June 1936)
Norway
Panama
Paraguay (with]drew 23 February 1935)
Persia (known as Iran from 1934)
Peru (withdrew 8 April 1939)
Poland
Portugal
Romania (withdrew 11 July 1940)
Kingdom of Serbs, Croats and Slovenes (known as Kingdom of Yugoslavia from 1929)
Siam (known as Thailand from 1939)
Spain (withdrew 9 May 1939)
Sweden
Switzerland
Uruguay
Venezuela (withdrew 12 July 1938)

1920
Austria (joined 15 December 1920; occupied and annexed by Germany 13 March 1938)
Bulgaria (joined 16 December 1920)
Costa Rica (joined 16 December 1920; withdrew 22 January 1925)
Finland (joined 16 December 1920)
Luxembourg (joined 16 December 1920)
Albania (joined 17 December 1920)

1921
Estonia (joined 22 September 1921; occupied and annexed by the Soviet Union in 1940)
Latvia (joined 22 September 1921; occupied and annexed by the Soviet Union in 1940)
Lithuania (joined 22 September 1921; occupied and annexed by the Soviet Union in 1940)

1922
Hungary (joined 18 September 1922; withdrew 11 April 1939)

1923
Éire (joined 10 September 1923, known as Ireland from 1937)
Abyssinia (joined 28 September 1923)

1924
Dominican Republic (joined 28 September 1924)

1926
German Reich (joined 8 September 1926; withdrew 19 October 1933)

1931
Mexico (joined 9 September 1931, declared a member 12 September 1931)

1932
Turkey (joined 18 July 1932)
Iraq (joined 3 October 1932)

1934
Soviet Union (joined 18 September 1934; expelled 14 December 1939) 
Afghanistan (joined 27 September 1934)
Ecuador (joined 28 September 1934)

1937
Egypt (joined 26 May 1937) (the last country to join before World War II)

See also

 Member states of the United Nations

References

Further reading

External links
 Map of League of Nations members
 worldstatesmen.org
 List of States Members of the League of Nations on 31.XII.1944 from the League of Nations Statistical Yearbook (1942-44)

League of Nations
League of Nations
League of Nations-related lists